Arthur Henry Dutton (November 13, 1838 – June 5, 1864) was an American career soldier. A trained military engineer and high graduate of West Point, he served mostly as an infantry officer in the Union Army, fighting within both the Eastern Theater and Western Theaters during the American Civil War.

Dutton also helped raise and became the first commander of the 21st Connecticut Volunteer Infantry in late 1862. He was mortally wounded in action at Bermuda Hundred in late May 1864, and was posthumously breveted a brigadier general.

Early life

Dutton was born in 1838 in Wallingford, Connecticut, to Samuel Dutton (1806–1851) and his wife Emily (Curtis) Dutton (1805–1875). He was married to Marion Sands Franklin (1840–1914) and the couple had at least one son, also named Arthur H. Dutton. Dutton's brother Clarence Edward (1841–1912) also was a soldier, serving as a major in his brother's Regiment during the American Civil War.

On September 1, 1857, Dutton entered the United States Military Academy at West Point, and graduated 3rd out of 34 cadets on June 24, 1861. That year he also began attending Yale University in New Haven, but did not graduate. However his high class placement from West Point allowed Dutton to enter the prestigious U.S. Army Corps of Engineers, and he was appointed as brevet second lieutenant the same day he graduated. On August 3 Dutton was promoted to full Second Lieutenant in the regular army.

Civil War service and death
In the early part of the war he served as a staff officer of Brig. Gen. Joseph K. Mansfield in Washington, D.C., and then he commanded the defenses of Fernandina, Florida. In the fall of 1862, Dutton began to form and train the volunteer 21st Connecticut Infantry Regiment in Norwalk. On September 5 he was commissioned the unit's colonel and commanding officer. The 21st Connecticut was organized as part of the IX Corps, Army of the Potomac. He then brought his regiment to Washington on September 11, and by November they were posted to Arlington Heights in Virginia as part of the defenses of Washington. From November 7–19 Dutton and his regiment marched to Falmouth, Virginia, and that December they fought during the Battle of Fredericksburg.

For his actions during the Battle of Fredericksburg on December 13, Dutton was brevetted a major in the Regular Army, to date from the day of the battle. He then lead his regiment during the unsuccessful Mud March of January 20–24, 1863. Dutton then began exercising brigade command in the IX Corps in February, and he was promoted to First Lieutenant in the Regular Army on March 3. He next went to North Carolina and participated in the Siege of Suffolk that April and May. There Dutton led a brigade of the VII Corps, and for his actions during the efforts to hold Suffolk he was brevetted a lieutenant colonel in the Regular Army on March 3. On October 2 he was promoted to the rank of Captain in the Regular Army, and from January 14–February 16, 1864. he was stationed  at Newport News, Virginia. Dutton next led a brigade in the XVIII Corps, Army of the James.

On May 26 Dutton was within Bermuda Hundred and was ordered to reconnoiter the opposing Confederate position with his brigade. Dutton advanced for about 2 miles and was on the skirmish line near Proctor's Creek, where he was hit mortally. He died of his wounds on June 5 in Baltimore, Maryland, and was buried at Arlington National Cemetery in Virginia. His family also erected a cenotaph to his memory at the In Memoriam Cemetery in Wallingford, Connecticut, where his brother Clarence was also later buried. He was posthumously brevetted to the rank of Colonel in the Regular Army and to Brigadier General of Volunteers for his actions at Bermuda Hundred.

A testimonial to Dutton was given by one of his fellow officers:

Notes

References
 Eicher, John H., and Eicher, David J., Civil War High Commands, Stanford University Press, 2001, .
 Hunt, Roger H., and Brown, John R., Brevet Brigadier Generals in Blue, Olde Soldier Books, 1990, revised 1997, .

External links
 
 togetherweserved.com entry for Dutton.

1838 births
1864 deaths
Burials at Arlington National Cemetery
People from Wallingford, Connecticut
People of Connecticut in the American Civil War
Union Army generals
Union military personnel killed in the American Civil War